Holidays on the River Yarra is a 1991 Australian drama film directed by Leo Berkeley. It was screened in the Un Certain Regard section at the 1991 Cannes Film Festival.

Plot
Disillusioned Melbourne teenage boys Mick and Eddie are looking for adventure and a means of escape. They unwittingly get themselves involved in a criminal enterprise, and somehow must find enough money to sail to Africa.:

Cast
 Craig Adams - Eddie
 Luke Elliot - Mick
 Alex Menglet - Big Mac
 Tahir Cambis - Stewie
 Claudia Karvan - Elsa
 Ian Scott - Frank
 Sheryl Munks - Valerie
 Angela McKenna - Mother
 Chris Askey - Mercenary
 John Brumpton - Mercenary
 Jacek Koman - Mercenary
 Eric Mueck - Billy
 Justin Connor - Danny
 Leong Lim - Shopkeeper
 Robert Ratti - Nick
 Arpad Mihaly - Chef

Box office
Holidays on the River Yarra grossed $24,600 at the box office in Australia.

See also
Cinema of Australia

References

External links

Holidays on the River Yarra at Oz Movies

1991 films
1991 drama films
Australian drama films
Australian independent films
1991 independent films
1990s English-language films
1990s Australian films